Ellermann is a surname. Notable people with the surname include:

Dina Ellermann (born 1980), Estonian dressage rider
Dustin Ellermann, American competitive shooter

See also
Ellerman